Daviesia dielsii, commonly known as Diels' daviesia, is a species of flowering plant in the family Fabaceae and is endemic to the south-west of Western Australia. It is on intricately-branched shrub with sharply-pointed, egg-shaped, vertically compressed phyllodes, and yellow and red flowers.

Description

Taxonomy and naming
Daviesia dielsii was first formally described in 1904 by Ernst Georg Pritzel in Botanische Jahrbücher für Systematik, Pflanzengeschichte und Pflanzengeographie. The specific epithet (dielsii) honours Ludwig Diels.

Distribution and habitat
Diels' daviesia grows in kwongan heath and on disturbed roadsides in the Dalwallinu-Moora-Three Springs area where it is known from fifteen populations.

Conservation status
Daviesia dielsii is listed as "endangered" under the Australian Government Environment Protection and Biodiversity Conservation Act 1999 and as "Threatened Flora (Declared Rare Flora — Extant)" by the Department of Biodiversity, Conservation and Attractions. The main threats to the species are road maintenance activities and weed invasion.

References

dielsii
Eudicots of Western Australia
Plants described in 1904
Taxa named by Ernst Pritzel